Houstonia longifolia, commonly known as long-leaved bluet or longleaf summer bluet, is a perennial plant in the family Rubiaceae. It can be found throughout most of the Eastern United States and Canada. It has been reported from every state east of the Mississippi River except Delaware, plus North Dakota, Minnesota, Missouri, Arkansas and Oklahoma, with isolated populations in Kansas and Texas. Also, all Canadian provinces from Quebec to Alberta. It prefers upland woods in poor, dry, often sandy soil.

Description
The stalks are slender and branching, with small white flowers with 4 petals. The basal rosette of leaves withers away before the flowers bloom, and opposite leaves appear at intervals along the stems. Flowers bloom for about a month in late spring and summer. It prefers full or partial shade and dry or mesic conditions.

Varieties
Two varieties are recognized:

Houstonia longifolia var. longifolia - From Georgia and Arkansas north to Canada
Houstonia longifolia var. tenuifolia (Nutt.) Alph.Wood. - Florida, Georgia, Tennessee, Virginia

References

External links
 USDA PLANTS Profile
Photo of herbarium specimen at Missouri Botanical Garden, isotype of Houstonia longifolia

Longifolia
Flora of the Eastern United States
Flora of the United States
Flora of Alberta
Flora of Manitoba
Flora of Quebec
Flora of Ontario
Flora of Saskatchewan
Plants described in 1788
Flora without expected TNC conservation status